Théâtre de Liège is a theatre in Liège, Belgium.

The theatre briefly became the subject of notoriety in July 2015 after it was found that its logo, designed by local designer Olivier Debie, had been plagiarized by the designer of the emblem for the 2020 Summer Olympics in Tokyo. Debie filed a lawsuit against the International Olympic Committee to prevent use of the infringing logo, which was withdrawn in September 2015 and replaced by a new design.

References

External links

Theatres in Liège
Theatres completed in 2013
2013 establishments in Belgium